Natallia Solohub, sometimes spelt Sologub (see Ge or He) (born March 31, 1975), is a Belarusian sprinter.

Solohub has won silver medals in 4 x 400 metres relay at the 2004 and 2006 World Indoor Championships, and a bronze medal in 4 x 100 m relay at the 2005 World Championships.

At the 2001 World Championships she failed a drugs test for norandrosterone. She was banned from the sport between August 2001 and August 2003.

See also
List of sportspeople sanctioned for doping offences

Personal bests
100 metres – 11.30 s (2005)
200 metres – 22.82 s (2005)
400 metres – 51.61 s (2001)

References

1975 births
Living people
Belarusian female sprinters
Athletes (track and field) at the 2000 Summer Olympics
Athletes (track and field) at the 2004 Summer Olympics
Olympic athletes of Belarus
Doping cases in athletics
Belarusian sportspeople in doping cases
World Athletics Championships medalists
World Athletics Indoor Championships medalists
Olympic female sprinters